The Roter Vogel is a German sailplane built in 1923 that was adapted for powered flight.

Design and development
The high-wing, Roter Vogel was first designed to be a conventional glider, and was adapted for powered flight with the smallest engine available at the time.

The Douglas engine was mounted flush inside the cockpit of the glider, with the prop driven by internal belts. The rudder and elevators were hinged to be a single movable surface.

Operational history
Roter Vogel placed second in the 1924 Roene Germany Light Aircraft Contest.

Specifications (Roter Vogel)

References

1920s German sailplanes
Motor gliders
Aircraft first flown in 1923
High-wing aircraft
Single-engined tractor aircraft